Vigdís Hauksdóttir (born 20 March 1965) was a member of parliament of the Althing, the Icelandic parliament. She is a former member of the Progressive Party. Currently a member of Reykjavík's city council for the Center Party.

External links
Althing biography

Living people
1965 births
Vigdis Hauksdottir
Vigdis Hauksdottir
Vigdis Hauksdottir